Johann Martin Mack, also known as John Martin Mack (April 13, 1715 – June 9, 1784), was a native of Württemberg, Germany and Moravian bishop, who was involved in founding the city of Bethlehem, Pennsylvania.

Biography
Mack emigrated from Germany in 1735, and settled in the Moravian colony in the province of Georgia in what is present-day Savannah.

From there, he traveled to the Province of Pennsylvania in 1741, where he initially settled in Nazareth, Pennsylvania and helped to found the Lehigh Valley community of Bethlehem.

 In 1742, Mack then also helped to initiate the first mission in Pennsylvania to the Native American trading village of Shamokin. Located near what, today, is the city of Sunbury, the village, which was also known by the Iroquois name of Otzinachson, had been established as early as 1711, and possibly even before that. By the late 1720s, Shamokin had become one of the most powerful Indian communities in Pennsylvania.

Mack and his wife, Jeannette, became the first Moravian missionaries to take up residency in the Shamokin village, living there for four months beginning in 1745. Their letters and diary entries portray their time as one of "constant danger."

Mack also subsequently helped establish the Lehigh Valley communities of Gnadenhütten and Nain.

A missionary to the Indian people in the region, Mack traveled for twenty years throughout Pennsylvania, the province of New York and New England before he and other Moravians were accused of being spies of the French, arrested and imprisoned at Milford, Connecticut, and banished from New York. Those charges were subsequently dropped in 1749 when the parliament of Great Britain acknowledged the Moravians to be an established, respected episcopal church, and encouraged their continued missionary efforts.

Mack was subsequently called to the West Indies to serve as the superintendent of Moravian missions in the Danish islands, where he spent the next twenty-two years advocating for enslaved men, women and children on Saint Croix, Saint John and Saint Thomas, where he resided.

In 1770, he returned to Bethlehem, where he was consecrated to the episcopacy on October 18. He then returned to the West Indies, where he continued his missionary work.

He died at the Friedensthal Mission at Saint Croix on June 9, 1784.

Further reading
 Werner Raupp: Ein vergnügter Herrnhuter – Johann Martin Mack, Württembergs erster evangelischer Missionar. In: Blätter für württembergische Kirchengeschichte, Vol. 92 (1992), p. 97–119
 Werner Raupp: Mack, Johann Martin. In: Biographisch-Bibliographisches Kirchenlexikon (BBKL), Vol. 5, Bautz, Herzberg 1993, Col. 531–533.
 Werner Raupp: Johann Martin Mack – Württembergs erster evangelischer Missionar. – In: Werner Raupp (Ed.): Gelebter Glaube. Erfahrungen und Lebenszeugnisse aus unserem Land. Ein Lesebuch herausgegeben von Werner Raupp, Metzingen/Württ. 1993, S. 162–166, 388 (Introd., source mat., Lit.).
 Werner Raupp: Mack, (Johann) Martin, in: Biographical Dictionary of Christian Missions. Edited by Gerald H. Anderson, New York [u. a.] 1998, p. 423.

References

American people of the Moravian Church
German emigrants to the Thirteen Colonies
American Protestant missionaries
1715 births
1784 deaths
Protestant missionaries in the United States
German Protestant missionaries